Gerrardstown is an unincorporated community village located along W.Va. Route 51 in Berkeley County in West Virginia's Eastern Panhandle region in the lower Shenandoah Valley.

History
Originally established as Middletown on November 22, 1787, by an act of the Virginia General Assembly, Gerrardstown was laid off by David Gerrard on Mill Creek, a tributary of Opequon Creek. Gerrard was the son of Baptist minister John Gerrard (for whom the town was named in 1787, the year of his death). It served as the site of Mill Creek Baptist Church, the first Baptist church west of the Blue Ridge Mountains and member of the Ketocton Association. Gerrardstown was designated as a National Historic District on the National Register of Historic Places in 1991. Many of the village's original buildings from the 18th and 19th centuries remain. According to the 2010 census, the Gerrardstown community has a population of 4,024.

Sites on the National Register of Historic Places

Continental Brick Protests 

In May 2008, Continental Brick applied to the Berkeley County Planning Board to open a massive 100 acre quarry, "North Mountain Shale, LLC," in Gerrardstown. The community instantly protested the approval of the building permit, due to the harsh amounts of pollution that would be blown into the air, and the possibility of nearby Mill Creek being polluted. Some residents of Gerrardstown use spigots to deliver water from Mill Creek. Parents in the Gerrardstown and Inwood areas protested because of air pollution that could be harmful to children while on the playgrounds at nearby schools; Gerrardstown Elementary School and Mountain Ridge Intermediate School.

As of 2012, the state of West Virginia had cleared the way for the mining operation.  http://www.potomacriverkeeper.org/updates/press-release-wv-surface-mine-board-approves-quarry-permit-despite-strong-local-opposition

Notable person 
 George M. Bowers, was an American politician who represented West Virginia in the United States House of Representatives.

References

External links 
Gerrardstown Elementary School
Mountain Ridge Intermediate School

Unincorporated communities in Berkeley County, West Virginia
Unincorporated communities in West Virginia
1787 establishments in Virginia
Populated places established in 1787